Van Smith (born August 14, 1996) is an American football safety who is currently a free agent. He played college football at Clemson.

Early years
Smith attended Hough High School in Cornelius, North Carolina. In high school, he played on both offense and defense. Offensively as a senior he carried the ball 66 times for 444 yards and 13 touchdowns along with returning two kickoffs for touchdowns. Defensively as a senior he tallied 74 tackles and six interceptions. He committed to play football for the Clemson Tigers on August 31, 2013, choosing the Tigers over the likes of Penn State, Michigan, Duke, and several others.

College career
As a true freshman in 2015, Smith played in 14 games, posting 19 tackles with one interception.

In 2016, as a sophomore, Smith started all 15 of the Tigers' games. He tallied 95 tackles, 5.5 tackles for loss, two interceptions, two forced fumbles and two pass deflections.

As a junior in 2017, Smith played in 13 of Clemson's 14 games, missing one due to a knee injury. In 13 games, he had 49 tackles, one interception, and one pass breakup. After the season, Smith declared for the 2018 NFL Draft.

Professional career
Smith signed with the Atlanta Legends of the Alliance of American Football, but failed to make the final roster.

References

External links
Clemson Tigers bio

1996 births
Living people
Players of American football from Charlotte, North Carolina
American football safeties
Clemson Tigers football players
Atlanta Legends players